Utladalen (or Utladal) is a valley in Årdal Municipality in Vestland county, Norway. It stretches north from the village of Øvre Årdal into the neighboring Luster Municipality. The Avdalen and Fardalen valleys branch off of the main Utladalen valley.

Utladalen is Norway's deepest valley. From Øvre Årdal, a comfortable walking road has been constructed, funded by voluntary contributions. The road passes through the Vetti farm area and crosses the Utla river on four spectacular bridges. The walking path ends at one of Norway's tallest waterfalls, Vettisfossen.

It includes both the valley and areas that extend both westward and northward to Jotunheim National Park, and eastward to lake Tyin.

Name
The official form on maps is Utledalen. The first element is the genitive of the river name Utla and the last element is the finite form of dal which means "dale" or "valley". The river name is probably derived from the verb utle which means "drift" or "fly"—the many waterfalls of the river creates a mist in the bottom of the valley.

References

External links
 Map of Jotunheimen National Park and Utladalen Landscape Protection Area 

 
Årdal
Luster, Norway
Valleys of Vestland